is a Japanese manga series written by Toshiki Inoue with original character design by Keita Amemiya and scenario by Wosamu Kine. The first twelve episodes ("Part I") of an anime adaption titled Sword Gai: The Animation were released on Netflix worldwide on March 23, 2018. Part II was released on July 30, 2018.

Plot
Gai is a young man who became an apprentice under a blacksmith named Amon, who found him as newborn holding on to a legendary cursed katana called "Shiryū" that drove his mother into committing suicide rather than let its bloodlust to consume her. The katana is revealed to be one of many cursed weapons that turn the user into a thrall to embody their murderous impulses, the Chrystalis gradually losing their humanity while becoming armored monsters called Busoma. After Gai lost his right arm when a ceremony to quell Shiryū goes awry, Amon forged the sword into a prosthetic limb for Gai. Becoming a chrysalis with the ability to fuse with his weapon, Gai clings on to his humanity while facing the Busoma seeking to exterminate humanity.

Characters

User of Demonic Sword Shiryu.

User of Chakram.

Daughter of Amon Ogata.

Adoptive father of Gai.
Kigetsu

User of Fallgon Sword.

User of Azoth Sword.
Mina Haraya

Administrator of the Shoshidai.
Midoriko

A Underground Idol and User of Flanberge Sword.
Yasuko Tanaka

User of Gallon's Hammer.
Issei Ariga

User of Nebestigma.
Arnys

Shin Matoba

Kazuma Matoba

Rie Matoba

Kuromaru

Kagatsuka

Himiko

Leader of the Gabi.
Kazumo

Hakim

Tatsumi

Kiyomi

Media

Manga
It began serialization in Hero's Inc.'s seinen manga magazine Hero's in 2012 and has been collected into six tankōbon volumes.

Anime
An anime adaptation originally developed by DLE and Fields was scheduled to air in April 2016, but it was delayed indefinitely until Netflix streamed the series worldwide on March 23, 2018. Tomohito Naka directed the series while Takahiro Ikezoe served as the chief director, Inoue himself wrote the scripts, Atsuko Nakajima designed the characters, Toshiki Kameyama was the sound designer, and Kotaro Nakagawa composed the music. Sword Gai: The Animation was animated by LandQ Studios. Sentai Filmworks will release the series on home video.

Season 1

Season 2

References

External links
  
 
 Sword Gai: The Animation on Netflix

2018 anime ONAs
Anime series based on manga
Dark fantasy anime and manga
Japanese-language Netflix original programming
Netflix original anime
Seinen manga
Shogakukan manga